Jack T. Chance is a fictional character featured in comic books published by DC Comics. He is a Green Lantern from the world of Garnet—also known as Hellhole. Physically, he is a tall, blue-skinned humanoid. Other distinguishing features include a trademark trench coat, what appear to be brown leather pants, and a skull around his neck. He first appears in Green Lantern Corps Quarterly #1 in the summer of 1992. The story was entitled "Layin' Down the Law".

Created by John Ostrander and Flint Henry, Chance is loosely based upon another Ostrander character named GrimJack.

Fictional character biography

Green Lantern of Garnet
Jack T. Chance is from the planet Garnet, also known as 'Hellhole' because it is one of the worst criminal worlds in existence. Repeatedly the Guardians of the Universe dispatched Green Lanterns to this planet in hope of redeeming the world, but each attempt ended in failure, usually fatally for the Green Lantern. The last Guardian-sent agent, Pathavim Seth-Ottarak, used his dying breath to instruct his ring to find a replacement among Hellhole's inhabitants uniquely suited to the challenges of the world (in other words, one not limited by the Green Lanterns' usual moral strictures). The ring chose Jack T. Chance. When the ring bonded with him it created a standard Green Lantern uniform and explained his duties to him. Chance rejected the idea of a uniform, refusing to wear anything other than his own trashy clothes with a single small added badge.

Chance hunted down the man who killed his predecessor, intending to kill him in turn, only to find the ring had a failsafe against lethal force. Further, the ring offered no protection against his opponent's yellow bullets. Thus Chance fell back on traditional methods and used a crude firearm to shoot the man dead. This became Jack's standard methodology as he went about pacifying Garnet, wearing down his targets with the powers of the ring then delivering a killing blow with a sidearm.

When news of this reached the Guardians, Chance was quickly recalled to Oa for judgement. The Guardians decided Chance would be subjected to rigorous training and a probationary period before he was allowed to continue serving with the Green Lantern Corps. Chance in turn threatened to simply quit if forced to play by their rules and pointed out his brutal approach was the first thing that had ever worked on Hellhole. The Guardians conceded they lacked a suitable alternative candidate to serve as Garnet's Green Lantern, and had no choice but to appoint Chance as Green Lantern of his planet. Chance and the Guardians brokered a deal whereby he was restricted to his planet (other Lanterns covered whole sectors). His deeds were also subject to reviews to ensure he was not using 'questionable methods'. 

Sometime later, while doing his duties on Garnet, he had the displeasure of encountering Lobo, and true to form the two got into a fight. Chance had the upper hand because of his ring and was enjoying the one-sided fight. The fight took a turn for the worse when Lobo realized that the ring had a weakness to yellow. Lobo covered himself in the yellow blood of a downed citizen, and defeated Chance. Knowing that he would be in a bad way when Lobo was finished with him, he ordered his ring not to forget anything important when the ring would put him back together. After winning the fight, Lobo had the idea of taking Chance's power ring before he left 'Hellhole', however, the ring could not be removed from its wielder's finger. Consequently, Lobo took the whole finger. As Lobo walked off, the ring informed him that, due to the specific deal the Guardians had made with Chance, it would not work beyond the parameters of Garnet's atmosphere. Disappointed, Lobo tossed the finger and ring, and left the planet. The ring and finger then made their way back to Chance and reattached themselves.

Emerald Twilight
When Hal Jordan went rogue and headed for Oa, the guardians were desperate and called Chance, as their most 'ruthless' agent, to stop the rampaging Jordan. To this end they granted his ring the same abilities as other members of the Corps, and its power was no longer limited to Garnet's atmosphere. While he did manage to surprise Jordan, his skill proved insufficient against his enemy's superior ability. Jordan took the rings from Chance and the other Green Lanterns, and left them for dead.

Return and death

Chance did not die, and instead was captured along with fellow Lost Lanterns, to be used by the Manhunters as energy for their newly upgraded software. He was freed by Hal Jordan and Guy Gardner and received a hero's welcome upon his return to Oa. Even though he and his fellow Lost Lanterns were aware that Hal Jordan's murderous actions were the result of the influence from the fear-inducing parasitic energy entity known as Parallax, they still bore grudges and remained unwilling to trust him again. Chance's return made the Guardians rethink his status as a probationary member, and he was finally accepted in the ranks of the Green Lantern Corps.

Chance and his fellow Lost Lanterns were all in the mess hall when the torchbearer Ion was whisked away by a yellow lantern ring during the Sinestro Corps attack on Oa. Jack and a select few Green Lanterns were sent to Qward to rescue Hal Jordan and the Green Lanterns of Earth. While on Qward they discovered the Torchbearer Kyle Rayner was now possessed by the fear entity Parallax, which had turned him as murderous as Hal was. Jack then confronted Parallax and was forced to experience his repressed fear of an abusive family/childhood. The Parallax-possessed Rayner then killed Chance and crushed his ring.

Blackest Night

As part of the Blackest Night event, all of the fallen Green Lanterns in the Oan crypt are reanimated by black power rings in Green Lantern Corps (vol. 2) #39 (October 2009). Chance is among the many Black Lanterns shown standing against the Green Lanterns on Oa.

Personal oath
You who are wicked, evil and mean
I'm the nastiest creep you've ever seen!
Come one, come all, put up a fight
I'll pound your butts with Green Lantern's light!
Yowza.

See also
 Kreon
 Tomar-Tu
 Boodikka
 Graf Toren
 Laira
 Ke'Haan
 Emerald Twilight

References

Comics characters introduced in 1992
DC Comics aliens
DC Comics extraterrestrial superheroes
DC Comics superheroes
Characters created by John Ostrander
Green Lantern Corps officers